Bruce Hensel (born 1947 or 1948) is an American physician, as well as a radio and television personality. He served as the chief medical correspondent for Los Angeles television station KNBC for nearly 30 years, reporting on medical issues and answering viewer questions in an "Ask Dr. Bruce" segment. (He should not be confused with Dr. Bruce Heischober, who frequently sat in for Drew Pinsky and was also referred to as Dr. Bruce.)

His television work won him 11 Emmys and two Golden Mike awards.

Hensel is also a producer, writer, and director. He has acted in Death Wish 4: The Crackdown and the 1980s TV soap opera Capitol. Hensel was also a guest on the radio show Loveline. He lives in Pacific Palisades.

On November 13, 2019, Hensel was arrested after he allegedly asked a 9-year-old girl to send him sexually explicit photos, according to both prosecutors and law enforcement. He faced one felony count of contact with a minor for sexual purposes. He faced up to 18 months in prison. Hensel's lawyer stated that his arrest came as a surprise.

On March 6, 2023, Hensel pleaded no contest to one count of contacting a minor with the intent to commit a crime. He was immediately ordered to register as a sex offender, and sentenced to two years of probation.

References

External links

Biography

American male non-fiction writers
American male television actors
20th-century American male actors
1948 births
Living people
University of California, Los Angeles alumni
Columbia University Vagelos College of Physicians and Surgeons alumni
American people convicted of child pornography offenses